Valentina Aniballi (born 18 April 1984) is an Italian female Discus thrower, that won four national championships and at the end of season 2015, with the measure of 58.55 m, had reached the 60th place in the world lists.

Biography
She participated at the 2014 European Athletics Championships (13th) and 2016 European Athletics Championships (25th) in both cases she failed to qualify to the final.

Personal best
Discus throw: 59.12 m -  Tarquinia, 13 June 2018

National titles
 Italian Athletics Championships
 Discus throw: 2013, 2014, 2018
Italian Winter Throwing Championships
 Discus throw: 2013, 2017, 2018

See also
 Italian all-time lists - Discus throw

References

External links
 

1984 births
Living people
Italian female discus throwers
Athletics competitors of Gruppo Sportivo Esercito
People from Rieti
Athletes (track and field) at the 2018 Mediterranean Games
Mediterranean Games competitors for Italy
Sportspeople from the Province of Rieti